, better known as , is a Japanese comedian represented by Office K.

Denpa Shōnen teki Kenshō Seikatsu  

Hamatsu was challenged to stay alone, unclothed, in an apartment for Susunu! Denpa Shōnen (January 1998 – March 2002), a Japanese reality-television show on Nippon Television, after winning a lottery for a "show business related job". He was challenged to enter mail-in sweepstakes until he won ¥1 million (about US$10,000) in total. He started with nothing (including no clothes), was cut off from outside communication and broadcasting, and had nothing to keep him company except the magazines he combed through for sweepstakes entry forms. After spending 335 days to reach his target, he set the Guinness world record for the "longest time survived on competition winnings".

Hamatsu lived in front of the camera, with only the possessions he won via the sweepstakes (save for basic utilities such as running water, heating and electricity), and the stacks of postcards and magazines required for entering the sweepstakes. Due to his nudity, an eggplant cartoon graphic covered his genitals when Hamatsu was standing on camera. Nasubi is the Japanese word for "eggplant"; the nickname was chosen due to his 30 cm long face that was said to be shaped like a Japanese eggplant, as well as the producers having to cover his genitals with an animated eggplant for the television audience. Hamatsu believed that he was being recorded and the show would be re-broadcast later once the footage had been gathered. In reality, the experiment was being live-streamed, with footage compiled and re-aired each week, complete with sound effects present at frequent intervals, using new tech to have 24/7 television to show him live using a joystick to cover up his genitals.

At first, he received no food at all, drinking only water and losing weight. Eventually, he won some sugary drinks from his sweepstakes entries. Later on, he won a bag of rice, but having not won any pots or containers with which to heat it, he was forced to eat it raw, and after devising a makeshift heating container with a discarded bag, he was able to cook the rice by placing it next to the lit stove. However, canned and kibble dog food became his primary food source for some time after running out of rice. After winning a stuffed toy in a sweepstake, he carried on conversations with it as his sensei, as it was his only sort of interaction. He never won clothing he could wear (only ladies' underwear that was too small for him to use), nor did he ever win anything to trim his growing facial hair and fingernails. He also won other prizes he was unable to use, like movie tickets and a bicycle (both of which would have required him to exit the apartment to utilize). However, he soon adapted the latter into a stationary bike. When he won a television set, he was unable to use it at first, as there was no cable or antenna hookup in the apartment (intentional by the producers out of fear he would discover he was already on TV). He would then win a PlayStation game, a copy of the train simulator title Densha de Go!, alongside the controller needed to play it.

By this time, the show had become so popular within Japanese households, that people were starting to decipher the location of his flat, with paparazzi, fans, and even the press standing outside without Hamatsu knowing it. As such, producers were forced to procure a new space far away from the original location. He was transported blindfolded, and upon uncovering his eyes, he discovered a similar living space, along with all his previously won possessions. When he questioned if he had completed the challenge, he was instead told the change of space was for his new address to "bring in more luck". As such, he continued writing sweepstake entries, with a large chair and desk becoming his first items acquired in his new space. However, he was moved into yet another space after a long streak of misfortune in his entries. In this new space, his TV set became useful when he later won a VCR, which could be used with two previous tapes he had won, and would later win a proper PlayStation. He would end up playing his game for multiple days straight, ultimately forcing himself to stop in order to keep entering sweepstakes and achieve his goal.

After winning a set of 4 car tires worth around 84000¥, he closed upon his goal, which he finally achieved with a bag of rice, 335 days after starting. After being informed of his victory, he was given back his clothes and blindfolded and taken to a surprise location. Hamatsu happily went along believing he was going to get a special prize for his year of hard work. After they removed his blindfold, he found himself in South Korea. He was given a day at an amusement park, where he was able to enjoy Korean food, and ride on the park's multiple attractions. However, after finishing, he was taken to another apartment. He was once again asked to take off his clothes and challenged to enter sweepstakes. Altough the producers said that if he didnt want to do it he doesnt have to, he still agreed. This time to win enough money to afford a flight with Japan Airlines to return home. However, when Hamatsu quickly met this goal after several weeks of entering competitions, it was revised multiple times, first to afford a ticket in business class, then first class; these goals were also met in a matter of weeks. When he had won enough to return to Japan he was blindfolded, clothed and taken to another apartment in Japan. When the blindfold was removed, he looked around, and instinctively took his clothes off, expecting to continue the challenge. However, the walls of the apartment fell away to reveal that he was actually in a TV studio with a huge live audience. Hamatsu was confused by this, because he thought the show had not yet been broadcast.

The entire ordeal lasted about 15 months, during which time his diaries on his experience of being locked away from the outside world became a best seller in Japan, and the TV show broke all records with 17 million viewers each Sunday night.

He reported being hot and sweaty wearing clothing for the first six months after his ordeal and had difficulty carrying on conversations for a long time.

In April 2020, Hamatsu tried persuading people to cooperate with the self-disciplined stay-at-home order during the wake of the initial COVID-19 outbreaks by citing his own personal experience with self-isolation.

Other activities
After the rigors he went through in order to become a famous comedian, Hamatsu was unable to succeed in the variety TV world. Instead, he became a local talent in his native Fukushima, as well as a dramatic stage actor, founding the stage troupe Eggplant Way, performing across Japan. He has appeared in Densha Otoko, Trick and Atashinchi no Danshi, and portrayed the character Watcherman in Kamen Rider W. He also appeared in the game 428: Shibuya Scramble.

In 2016, Hamatsu successfully scaled Mount Everest after two aborted attempts in 2014 and 2015.

See also
 Za Gaman, another popular Japanese game show that also focused on the suffering of contestants

References

External links
 
 
 
 Article about the show and Japanese culture
 Tomoaki Hamatsu (archived), Quirky Japan Homepage.
  An interview with Tomoaki Hamatsu, and the story of his experiences on Susunu! Denpa Shōnen.

1975 births
Japanese comedians
People from Fukushima, Fukushima
Living people
Reality television participants
Television in Japan